Frank McCarthy (March 30, 1924 – November 17, 2002) was an American artist and realist painter known for advertisements, magazine artwork, paperback covers, film posters, and paintings of the American West.

Biography

Born in New York City, he studied under George Bridgman and Reginald Marsh at the Art Students League of New York then attended the Pratt Institute in Brooklyn.

Types of works

McCarthy began his art career as a commercial illustrator, opening his own studio in 1948. He did illustrations for most of the paperback book publishers, magazines, including Colliers, Argosy, and True, movie companies, and advertisements.

Among McCarthy's film poster work were The Ten Commandments, Hatari!, Hero's Island, The Great Escape, and with Robert McGinnis, Thunderball, You Only Live Twice and On Her Majesty's Secret Service.

McCarthy left the commercial art world in 1968 in order to concentrate on Western paintings. In 1975 he was invited to join the Cowboy Artists of America. His 1972 painting "The Last Crossing" was used by The Marshall Tucker Band in 1976 for the cover of their fifth studio album, Long Hard Ride. He was inducted into the Society of Illustrators Hall of Fame in 1997.

Death

McCarthy died of lung cancer in 2002 at his home of 30 years in Sedona, Arizona.

See also
 Richard Amsel
 Saul Bass
 Jack Davis
 Frank Frazetta
 The Brothers Hildebrandt
 Tom Jung
 Sanford Kossin
 Bob Peak
 Drew Struzan
 Howard Terpning

References
 McCarthy, Paintings of the Old West by Frank C. McCarthy, 1977, R. W. Norton Art Gallery.
 McCarthy, Frank C. McCarthy: The Old West; A Portrait of Paintings, 1981, Greenwich Press Ltd.
 McCarthy, Frank C. McCarthy: a Commemoration of the Fifteenth Anniversary of a Printmaking Partnership, 1989, Greenwich Workshop.
 Kelton, Elmer and McCarthy, Frank C., The Art of Frank C. McCarthy, 1992 William Morrow & Co.

Notes

External links
Frank McCarthy artwork can be viewed at American Art Archives website
website
fansite
Frank McCarthy Artist Biography

American illustrators
Film poster artists
1924 births
2002 deaths
20th-century American painters
American male painters
Artists of the American West
Deaths from lung cancer
Art Students League of New York alumni
Deaths from cancer in Arizona
Pratt Institute alumni
20th-century American male artists